Balqis or Balqees (in Arabic بلقيس) is a given name. It may refer to:

Balqis (queen), Arabic known name of Queen of Sheba
Balqis Sidawi (born 1935), Lebanese writer and poet
Balqees Ahmed Fathi  (born 1988), widely known by the mononym Balqees, Emirati singer.